Tortoise Hill is a hill more than 500 m high, 3 nautical miles (6 km) west of The Watchtower at the southeast corner of James Ross Island. Named by United Kingdom Antarctic Place-Names Committee (UK-APC) following Falkland Islands Dependencies Survey (FIDS) surveys, 1958–61. The feature is similar geologically and in appearance to Terrapin Hill in the northeast portion of the island; hence the application of a related name.

Hills of Graham Land
Landforms of James Ross Island